Las Dos Caras de Ana (English: The Two Faces of Ana) is a Mexican telenovela produced by Televisa and Fonovideo. The telenovela aired on Canal de las Estrellas from September 25, 2006 to March 9, 2007. It stars Ana Layevska, Rafael Amaya, Maria Rubio, Mauricio Aspe, Alexa Damian, and Leonardo Daniel. The telenovela was produced, filmed and set in Miami, Florida. The title is a play upon the phrase "las dos caras de Jano" (the two faces of Janus). In the United States, the telenovela aired on Univision from December 18, 2006 to June 4, 2007.

Plot
We meet Ana Escudero in Miami with her entire family in a two-story house until one fateful night when Ana's entire world crashes down on top of her. In the grand debut of the telenovela, the rash Ignacio Bustamante destroyed Ana's life when he runs over her brother while he is trying to change the tire to his car. To cover up the accident, Ignacio purposely throws a sleeping gas bomb into her house while her mom and brother's fiance are inside and then sets the house on fire. Everyone believes it was Ana who died. Her brother, who was in a coma, came out of it, but paralyzed. Afraid for their lives, they move to New York for two years before Fabian dies of an aneurism. Because of this, Ana vows revenge on the Bustamante family and takes on a new persona. Unknowingly, at the same time, Ana meets the brother of Ignacio named Rafael, the son who had been disowned by his father for refusing to go into the family business and wanting to pursue an acting career. Ana falls in love with Gustavo, not realizing that he's part of the family that she wants to seek revenge on, they end up together.

Cast

Main 
 Ana Layevska as Ana Escudero/Marcia Lazcano
 Rafael Amaya as Rafael Bustamante/Gustavo Galvan

Also main 
 Maria Rubio as Graciela Salgado
 Leonardo Daniel as Humberto Bustamante
 Mauricio Aspe as Ignacio Bustamante
 Francisco Rubio as Vicente Bustamante
 Allisson Lozz as Paulina Gardel
 Hector Saez as Dionisio Jimenez
 Raquel Morell as Rebeca
 Maria Fernanda Garcia as Cristina Duran
 Eduardo Rivera as Marcos
 Tono Mauri as Adrian Ponce
 Susana Diazayas as Sofia Ortega
 Melvin Cabrera as Leonardo "Leo" Jimenez
 Alexa Damian as Irene Alcaraz

Recurring 
 Ismael La Rosa as Eric Guerra
 Liliana Rodriguez as Catalina "Katy" Magaña 
 Alexandra Graña as Tina Bonilla
 Hannah Zea as Vania Avendaño
 Julián Legaspi as Javier
 Graciela Bernardos as Aurora
 Mariana Huerdo as Claudia
 William Colmenares as Otto
 Juan Vidal as Cristóbal
 Celia Paulina as Kelly
 Ivelin Giro as Natalia
 Rosalinda Rodríguez as Úrsula

Special participation 
 Socorro Bonilla as Julia
 Miguel Ángel Biaggio as Fabián
 Jorge Aravena as Santiago

Awards and nominations

TV Y Novelas 2007

9 nominations, none received.

References

2006 telenovelas
2007 telenovelas
2006 Mexican television series debuts
2007 Mexican television series endings
2006 American television series debuts
2007 American television series endings
Television shows set in Miami
Mexican telenovelas
Spanish-language American telenovelas
Spanish-language telenovelas
Televisa telenovelas